Becka may refer to:

People
 Becka Leathers, American freestyle wrestler
 Ivo Stern Becka
 Jaromir Becka (born 1963), Czechoslovak tennis player
 Marek Bečka
 Pavel Bečka (born 1970), Czech basketball player
 Tom Becka, American talk radio personality

Places
 Becka or Becky Falls, England
 Becka Brook, tributary of the River Bovey, England